In astronomy, a vertical circle is a great circle on the celestial sphere that is perpendicular to the horizon. Therefore, it contains the vertical direction, passing through the zenith and the nadir. There is a vertical circle for any given azimuth, where azimuth is the angle measured east from the north on the celestial horizon. The vertical circle which is on the east–west direction is called the prime vertical. The vertical circle which is on the north–south direction is called the local celestial meridian (LCM), or principal vertical. Vertical circles are part of the horizontal coordinate system.

Instruments like this were more common in 19th century observatories and were important for locating and recording coordinates in the cosmos, and observatories often had various other instruments for certain functions as well as advanced clocks of the period. The popularly known example in the observatories, were the Great refractors which became larger and larger and came to have dominating effect to the point that observatories were moved simply to have better conditions for their biggest telescope, in the modern style where observatories often have one instrument only in a remote location on the Earth or even in outer space. However, in the 19th century it was more basic with observatorys often making recording of coordinates of different items and to determine the shape of the Earth and times.

See also
Meridian circle
Equatorial telescope
Comet seeker

References

Astronomical coordinate systems